In metaphysics, ontology is the philosophical study of being, as well as related concepts such as existence, becoming, and reality. 

Ontology addresses questions like how entities are grouped into categories and which of these entities exist on the most fundamental level. Ontologists often try to determine what the categories or highest kinds are and how they form a system of categories that encompasses the classification of all entities. Commonly proposed categories include substances, properties, relations, states of affairs, and events. These categories are characterized by fundamental ontological concepts, including particularity and universality, abstractness and concreteness, or possibility and necessity. Of special interest is the concept of ontological dependence, which determines whether the entities of a category exist on the most fundamental level. Disagreements within ontology are often about whether entities belonging to a certain category exist and, if so, how they are related to other entities.

When used as a countable noun, the words ontology and ontologies refer not to the science of being but to theories within the science of being. Ontological theories can be divided into various types according to their theoretical commitments. Monocategorical ontologies hold that there is only one basic category, but polycategorical ontologies rejected this view. Hierarchical ontologies assert that some entities exist on a more fundamental level and that other entities depend on them. Flat ontologies, on the other hand, deny such a privileged status to any entity.

Etymology 

The compound word ontology ('study of being') combines
 onto- and
 -logia.

While the etymology is Greek, the oldest extant records of the word itself is a New Latin form , which appeared
 in 1606 in the Ogdoas Scholastica by Jacob Lorhard (Lorhardus), and
 in 1613 in the Lexicon philosophicum by Rudolf Göckel (Goclenius).
The first occurrence in English of ontology, as recorded by the Oxford English Dictionary, came in 1664 through Archelogia philosophica nova... by Gideon Harvey. The word was first used, in its Latin form, by philosophers, and based on the Latin roots (and in turn on the Greek ones).

Overview 

Ontology is closely associated with Aristotle's question of 'being qua being': the question of what all entities in the widest sense have in common. The Eleatic principle is one answer to this question: it states that being is inextricably tied to causation, that "Power is the mark of Being". One problem with this answer is that it excludes abstract objects. Another explicit but little accepted answer can be found in Berkeley's slogan that "to be is to be perceived". Intimately related but not identical to the question of 'being qua being' is the problem of categories. Categories are usually seen as the highest kinds or genera. A system of categories provides a classification of entities that is exclusive and exhaustive: every entity belongs to exactly one category. Various such classifications have been proposed, they often include categories for substances, properties, relations, states of affairs or events. At the core of the differentiation between categories are various fundamental ontological concepts and distinctions, for example, the concepts of particularity and universality, of abstractness and concreteness, of ontological dependence, of identity and of modality. These concepts are sometimes treated as categories themselves, are used to explain the difference between categories or play other central roles for characterizing different ontological theories. Within ontology, there is a lack of general consensus concerning how the different categories are to be defined. Different ontologists often disagree on whether a certain category has any members at all or whether a given category is fundamental.

Particulars and universals 
Particulars or individuals are usually contrasted with universals. Universals concern features that can be exemplified by various different particulars. For example, a tomato and a strawberry are two particulars that exemplify the universal redness. Universals can be present at various distinct locations in space at the same time while particulars are restricted to one location at a time. Furthermore, universals can be fully present at different times, which is why they are sometimes referred to as repeatables in contrast to non-repeatable particulars. The so-called problem of universals is the problem to explain how different things can agree in their features, e.g. how a tomato and a strawberry can both be red. Realists about universals believe that there are universals. They can solve the problem of universals by explaining the commonality through a universal shared by both entities. Realists are divided among themselves as to whether universals can exist independently of being exemplified by something ("ante res") or not ("in rebus"). Nominalists, on the other hand, deny that there are universals. They have to resort to other notions to explain how a feature can be common to several entities, for example, by positing either fundamental resemblance-relations between the entities (resemblance nominalism) or a shared membership to a common natural class (class nominalism).

Abstract and concrete 

Many philosophers agree that there is an exclusive and exhaustive distinction between concrete objects and abstract objects. Some philosophers consider this to be the most general division of being. Examples of concrete objects include plants, human beings and planets while things like numbers, sets and propositions are abstract objects. But despite the general agreement concerning the paradigm cases, there is less consensus as to what the characteristic marks of concreteness and abstractness are. Popular suggestions include defining the distinction in terms of the difference between (1) existence inside or outside space-time, (2) having causes and effects or not and (3) having contingent or necessary existence.

Ontological dependence 

An entity ontologically depends on another entity if the first entity cannot exist without the second entity. Ontologically independent entities, on the other hand, can exist all by themselves. For example, the surface of an apple cannot exist without the apple and so depends on it ontologically. Entities often characterized as ontologically dependent include properties, which depend on their bearers, and boundaries, which depend on the entity they demarcate from its surroundings. As these examples suggest, ontological dependence is to be distinguished from causal dependence, in which an effect depends for its existence on a cause. It is often important to draw a distinction between two types of ontological dependence: rigid and generic. Rigid dependence concerns the dependence on one specific entity, as the surface of an apple depends on its specific apple. Generic dependence, on the other hand, involves a weaker form of dependence, on merely a certain type of entity. For example, electricity generically depends on there being charged particles, but it does not depend on any specific charged particle. Dependence-relations are relevant to ontology since it is often held that ontologically dependent entities have a less robust form of being. This way a hierarchy is introduced into the world that brings with it the distinction between more and less fundamental entities.

Identity 
Identity is a basic ontological concept that is often expressed by the word "same". It is important to distinguish between qualitative identity and numerical identity. For example, consider two children with identical bicycles engaged in a race while their mother is watching. The two children have the same bicycle in one sense (qualitative identity) and the same mother in another sense (numerical identity). Two qualitatively identical things are often said to be indiscernible. The two senses of sameness are linked by two principles: the principle of indiscernibility of identicals and the principle of identity of indiscernibles. The principle of indiscernibility of identicals is uncontroversial and states that if two entities are numerically identical with each other then they exactly resemble each other. The principle of identity of indiscernibles, on the other hand, is more controversial in making the converse claim that if two entities exactly resemble each other then they must be numerically identical. This entails that "no two distinct things exactly resemble each other". A well-known counterexample comes from Max Black, who describes a symmetrical universe consisting of only two spheres with the same features. Black argues that the two spheres are indiscernible but not identical, thereby constituting a violation of the principle of identity of indiscernibles.

The problem of identity over time concerns the question of persistence: whether or in what sense two objects at different times can be numerically identical. This is usually referred to as diachronic identity in contrast to synchronic identity. The statement that "[t]he table in the next room is identical with the one you purchased last year" asserts diachronic identity between the table now and the table then. A famous example of a denial of diachronic identity comes from Heraclitus, who argues that it is impossible to step into the same river twice because of the changes that occurred in-between. The traditional position on the problem of persistence is endurantism, the thesis that diachronic identity in a strict sense is possible. One problem with this position is that it seems to violate the principle of indiscernibility of identicals: the object may have undergone changes in the meantime resulting in it being discernible from itself. Perdurantism or four-dimensionalism is an alternative approach holding that diachronic identity is possible only in a loose sense: while the two objects differ from each other strictly speaking, they are both temporal parts that belong to the same temporally extended whole. Perdurantism avoids many philosophical problems plaguing endurantism, but endurantism seems to be more in touch with how we ordinarily conceive diachronic identity.

Modality 
Modality concerns the concepts of possibility, actuality and necessity. In contemporary discourse, these concepts are often defined in terms of possible worlds. A possible world is a complete way how things could have been. The actual world is one possible world among others: things could have been different from what they actually are. A proposition is possibly true if there is at least one possible world in which it is true; it is necessarily true if it is true in all possible worlds. Actualists and possibilists disagree on the ontological status of possible worlds. Actualists hold that reality is at its core actual and that possible worlds should be understood in terms of actual entities, for example, as fictions or as sets of sentences. Possibilists, on the other hand, assign to possible worlds the same fundamental ontological status as to the actual world. This is a form of modal realism, holding that reality has irreducibly modal features. Another important issue in this field concerns the distinction between contingent and necessary beings. Contingent beings are beings whose existence is possible but not necessary. Necessary beings, on the other hand, could not have failed to exist. It has been suggested that this distinction is the highest division of being.

Substances 
The category of substances has played a central role in many ontological theories throughout the history of philosophy. "Substance" is a technical term within philosophy not to be confused with the more common usage in the sense of chemical substances like gold or sulfur. Various definitions have been given but among the most common features ascribed to substances in the philosophical sense is that they are particulars that are ontologically independent: they are able to exist all by themselves. Being ontologically independent, substances can play the role of fundamental entities in the ontological hierarchy. If 'ontological independence' is defined as including causal independence then only self-caused entities, like Spinoza's God, can be substances. With a specifically ontological definition of 'independence', many everyday objects like books or cats may qualify as substances. Another defining feature often attributed to substances is their ability to undergo changes. Changes involve something existing before, during and after the change. They can be described in terms of a persisting substance gaining or losing properties, or of matter changing its form. From this perspective, the ripening of a tomato may be described as a change in which the tomato loses its greenness and gains its redness. It is sometimes held that a substance can have a property in two ways: essentially and accidentally. A substance can survive a change of accidental properties but it cannot lose its essential properties, which constitute its nature.

Properties and relations 

The category of properties consists of entities that can be exemplified by other entities, e.g. by substances. Properties characterize their bearers, they express what their bearer is like. For example, the red color and the round shape of an apple are properties of this apple. Various ways have been suggested concerning how to conceive properties themselves and their relation to substances. The traditionally dominant view is that properties are universals that inhere in their bearers. As universals, they can be shared by different substances. Nominalists, on the other hand, deny that universals exist. Some nominalists try to account for properties in terms of resemblance relations or class membership. Another alternative for nominalists is to conceptualize properties as simple particulars, so-called tropes. This position entails that both the apple and its redness are particulars. Different apples may still exactly resemble each other concerning their color, but they do not share the same particular property on this view: the two color-tropes are numerically distinct. Another important question for any theory of properties is how to conceive the relation between a bearer and its properties. Substratum theorists hold that there is some kind of substance, substratum or bare particular that acts as bearer. Bundle theory is an alternative view that does away with a substratum altogether: objects are taken to be just a bundle of properties. They are held together not by a substratum but by the so-called compresence-relation responsible for the bundling. Both substratum theory and bundle theory can be combined with conceptualizing properties as universals or as particulars.

An important distinction among properties is between categorical and dispositional properties. Categorical properties concern what something is like, e.g. what qualities it has. Dispositional properties, on the other hand, involve what powers something has, what it is able to do, even if it is not actually doing it. For example, the shape of a sugar cube is a categorical property while its tendency to dissolve in water is a dispositional property. For many properties there is a lack of consensus as to how they should be classified, for example, whether colors are categorical or dispositional properties. Categoricalism is the thesis that on a fundamental level there are only categorical properties, that dispositional properties are either non-existent or dependent on categorical properties. Dispositionalism is the opposite theory, giving ontological primacy to dispositional properties. Between these two extremes, there are dualists who allow both categorical and dispositional properties in their ontology.

Relations are ways in which things, the relata, stand to each other. Relations are in many ways similar to properties in that both characterize the things they apply to. Properties are sometimes treated as a special case of relations involving only one relatum. Central for ontology is the distinction between internal and external relations. A relation is internal if it is fully determined by the features of its relata. For example, an apple and a tomato stand in the internal relation of similarity to each other because they are both red. Some philosophers have inferred from this that internal relations do not have a proper ontological status since they can be reduced to intrinsic properties. External relations, on the other hand, are not fixed by the features of their relata. For example, a book stands in an external relation to a table by lying on top of it. But this is not determined by the book's or the table's features like their color, their shape, etc.

States of affairs and events 
States of affairs are complex entities, in contrast to substances and properties, which are usually conceived as simple. Complex entities are built up from or constituted by other entities. Atomic states of affairs are constituted by one particular and one property exemplified by this particular. For example, the state of affairs that Socrates is wise is constituted by the particular "Socrates" and the property "wise". Relational states of affairs involve several particulars and a relation connecting them. States of affairs that obtain are also referred to as facts. It is controversial which ontological status should be ascribed to states of affairs that do not obtain. States of affairs have been prominent in 20th-century ontology as various theories were proposed to describe the world as composed of states of affairs. It is often held that states of affairs play the role of truthmakers: judgments or assertions are true because the corresponding state of affairs obtains.

Events take place in time, they are sometimes thought of as involving a change in the form of acquiring or losing a property, like the lawn's becoming dry. But on a liberal view, the retaining of a property without any change may also count as an event, e.g. the lawn's staying wet. Some philosophers see events as universals that can repeat at different times, but the more dominant view is that events are particulars and therefore non-repeatable. Some events are complex in that they are composed of a sequence of events, often referred to as a process. But even simple events can be conceived as complex entities involving an object, a time and the property exemplified by the object at this time. So-called process philosophy or process ontology ascribes ontological primacy to changes and processes as opposed to the emphasis on static being in the traditionally dominant substance metaphysics.

Reality of things

The word 'real' is derived from the Latin word res, which is often translated as 'thing'. The word 'thing' is often used in ontological discourse as if it had a presupposed meaning, not needing an explicit philosophical definition because it belongs to ordinary language. Nevertheless, what is a thing and what is real or substantial are concerns of ontology. Different views are held about this. Plato proposed that underlying, and constituting the real basis of, the concretely experienced world are 'forms' or 'ideas', which today are generally regarded as high abstractions. In earlier days, philosophers used the term 'realism' to refer to Plato's belief that his 'forms' are 'real'; nowadays, the term 'realism' often has an almost opposite meaning, so that Plato's belief is sometimes called 'idealism'. Philosophers debate whether entities such as tables and chairs, lions and tigers, philosophical doctrines, numbers, truth, and beauty, are to be regarded as 'things', or as something or nothing 'real'.

Types of ontologies
Ontological theories can be divided into various types according to their theoretical commitments. Particular ontological theories or types of theories are often referred to as "ontologies" (singular or plural). This usage contrasts with the meaning of "ontology" (only singular) as a branch of philosophy: the science of being in general.

Flat vs polycategorical vs hierarchical 
One way to divide ontologies is by the number of basic categories they use. Monocategorical or one category ontologies hold that there is only one basic category while polycategorical ontologies imply that there are several distinct basic categories. Another way to divide ontologies is through the notion of ontological hierarchy. Hierarchical ontologies assert that some entities exist on a more fundamental level and that other entities depend on them. Flat ontologies, on the other hand, deny such a privileged status to any entities. Jonathan Schaffer provides an overview of these positions by distinguishing between flat ontologies (non-hierarchical), sorted ontologies (polycategorical non-hierarchical) and ordered ontologies (polycategorical hierarchical).

Flat ontologies are only interested in the difference between existence and non-existence. They are flat because each flat ontology can be represented by a simple set containing all the entities to which this ontology is committed. An influential exposition of this approach comes from Willard Van Orman Quine which is why it has been referred to as the Quinean approach to meta-ontology. This outlook does not deny that the existing entities can be further subdivided and may stand in various relations to each other. These issues are questions for the more specific sciences, but they do not belong to ontology in the Quinean sense.

Polycategorical ontologies are concerned with the categories of being. Each polycategorical ontology posits a number of categories. These categories are exclusive and exhaustive: every existing entity belongs to exactly one category. A recent example of a polycategorical ontology is E.J. Lowe's four-category-ontology. The four categories are object, kind, mode and attribute. The fourfold structure is based on two distinctions. The first distinction is between substantial entities (objects and kinds) and non-substantial entities (modes and attributes). The second distinction is between particular entities (objects and modes) and universal entities (kinds and attributes). Reality is built up through the interplay of entities belonging to different categories: particular entities instantiate universal entities, and non-substantial entities characterize substantial entities.

Hierarchical ontologies are interested in the degree of fundamentality of the entities they posit. Their main goal is to figure out which entities are fundamental and how the non-fundamental entities depend on them. The concept of fundamentality is usually defined in terms of metaphysical grounding. Fundamental entities are different from non-fundamental entities because they are not grounded in other entities. For example, it is sometimes held that elementary particles are more fundamental than the macroscopic objects (like chairs and tables) they compose. This is a claim about the grounding-relation between microscopic and macroscopic objects. Schaffer's priority monism is a recent form of a hierarchical ontology. He holds that on the most fundamental level there exists only one thing: the world as a whole. This thesis does not deny our common-sense intuition that the distinct objects we encounter in our everyday affairs like cars or other people exist. It only denies that these objects have the most fundamental form of existence. An example of a hierarchical ontology in continental philosophy comes from Nicolai Hartmann. He asserts that reality is made up of four levels: the inanimate, the biological, the psychological and the spiritual. These levels form a hierarchy in the sense that the higher levels depend on the lower levels while the lower levels are indifferent to the higher levels.

Thing ontologies vs fact ontologies
Thing ontologies and fact ontologies are one-category-ontologies: they both hold that all fundamental entities belong to the same category. They disagree on whether this category is the category of things or of facts. A slogan for fact ontologies comes from Ludwig Wittgenstein: "The world is the totality of facts, not of things".

One difficulty in characterizing this dispute is to elucidate what things and facts are, and how they differ from each other. Things are commonly contrasted with the properties and relations they instantiate. Facts, on the other hand, are often characterized as having these things and the properties/relations as their constituents. This is reflected in a rough linguistic characterization of this difference where the subjects and objects of an assertion refer to things while the assertion as a whole refers to a fact.

Reism is one form of thing ontology. Franz Brentano developed a version of reism in his later philosophy. He held that only concrete particular things exist. Things can exist in two forms: either as spatio-temporal bodies or as temporal souls. Brentano was aware of the fact that many common-sense expressions seem to refer to entities that do not have a place in his ontology, like properties or intentional objects. This is why he developed a method to paraphrase these expressions in order to avoid these ontological commitments.

D. M. Armstrong is a well-known defender of fact ontology. He and his followers refer to facts as states of affairs. States of affairs are the basic building blocks of his ontology: they have particulars and universals as their constituents but they are primary in relation to particulars and universals. States of affairs have ontologically independent existence while "[u]npropertied particulars and uninstantiated universals are false abstractions".

Constituent ontologies vs blob theories
Constituent ontologies and blob theories, sometimes referred to as relational ontologies, are concerned with the internal structure of objects. Constituent ontologies hold that objects have an internal structure made up of constituents. This is denied by blob theories: they contend that objects are structureless "blobs".

Bundle theories are examples of constituent ontologies. Bundle theorists assert that an object is nothing but the properties it "has". On this account, a regular apple could be characterized as a bundle of redness, roundness, sweetness, etc. Defenders of bundle theory disagree on the nature of the bundled properties. Some affirm that these properties are universals while others contend that they are particulars, so-called "tropes".

Class nominalism, on the other hand, is a form of blob theory. Class nominalists hold that properties are classes of things. To instantiate a property is merely to be a member of the corresponding class. So properties are not constituents of the objects that have them.

Information science and natural sciences
In information science ontologies are classified in various ways, using criteria such as the degree of abstraction and field of application:

 Upper ontology: concepts supporting development of an ontology, meta-ontology.
 Domain ontology: concepts relevant to a particular topic, domain of discourse, or area of interest, for example, to information technology or to computer languages, or to particular branches of science.
 Interface ontology: concepts relevant to the juncture of two disciplines.
 Process ontology: inputs, outputs, constraints, sequencing information, involved in business or engineering processes.
In the biomedical sciences, ontologies have been used to create terminologies for various aspects of living organism or medical applications. A prominent example is the gene ontology, but many other ontologies exist, e.g. for anatomical terms or physiology. Standards have been established to maintain and organize biological ontologies under the OBO (Open Biological Ontologies) project.

History

Ancient Greek 

In the Greek philosophical tradition, Parmenides was among the first to propose an ontological characterization of the fundamental nature of existence. In the prologue (or proem) to On Nature, he describes two views of existence. Initially, nothing comes from nothing, thus existence is eternal. This posits that existence is what may be conceived of by thought, created, or possessed. Hence, there may be neither void nor vacuum; and true reality neither may come into being nor vanish from existence. Rather, the entirety of creation is eternal, uniform, and immutable, though not infinite (Parmenides characterized its shape as that of a perfect sphere). Parmenides thus posits that change, as perceived in everyday experience, is illusory.

Opposite to the Eleatic monism of Parmenides is the pluralistic conception of being. In the 5th century BC, Anaxagoras and Leucippus replaced the reality of being (unique and unchanging) with that of becoming, therefore by a more fundamental and elementary ontic plurality. This thesis originated in the Hellenic world, stated in two different ways by Anaxagoras and by Leucippus. The first theory dealt with "seeds" (which Aristotle referred to as "homeomeries") of the various substances. The second was the atomistic theory, which dealt with reality as based on the vacuum, the atoms and their intrinsic movement in it.

The materialist atomism proposed by Leucippus was indeterminist, but Democritus ( 460 –  370 BC) subsequently developed it in a deterministic way. Later (4th century BC), Epicurus took the original atomism again as indeterministic. He saw reality as composed of an infinity of indivisible, unchangeable corpuscles or atoms (from the Greek atomon, lit. 'uncuttable'), but he gives weight to characterize atoms whereas for Leucippus they are characterized by a "figure", an "order" and a "position" in the cosmos. Atoms are, besides, creating the whole with the intrinsic movement in the vacuum, producing the diverse flux of being. Their movement is influenced by the parenklisis (Lucretius names it clinamen) and that is determined by chance. These ideas foreshadowed the understanding of traditional physics until the advent of 20th-century theories on the nature of atoms.

Plato 
Plato developed the distinction between true reality and illusion, in arguing that what is real are eternal and unchanging forms or ideas (a precursor to universals), of which things experienced in sensation are at best merely copies, and real only in so far as they copy ("partake of") such forms. In general, Plato presumes that all nouns (e.g., "beauty") refer to real entities, whether sensible bodies or insensible forms. Hence, in The Sophist, Plato argues that being is a form in which all existent things participate and which they have in common (though it is unclear whether "Being" is intended in the sense of existence, copula, or identity); and argues, against Parmenides, that forms must exist not only of being, but also of Negation and of non-being (or Difference).

Aristotle 
In his Categories, Aristotle (384–322 BCE) identifies ten possible kinds of things that may be the subject or the predicate of a proposition. For Aristotle there are four different ontological dimensions:

 according to the various categories or ways of addressing a being as such
 according to its truth or falsity (e.g. fake gold, counterfeit money)
 whether it exists in and of itself or simply 'comes along' by accident
 according to its potency, movement (energy) or finished presence (Metaphysics Book Theta).

Hindu philosophy
Ontology features in the Samkhya school of Hindu philosophy from the first millennium BCE. Samkhya philosophy regards the universe as consisting of two independent realities: puruṣa (pure, contentless consciousness) and prakṛti (matter). The substance dualism between puruṣa and prakṛti is similar but not identical to the substance dualism between mind and body that, following the works of Descartes, has been central to many disputes in the Western philosophical tradition. Samkhya sees the mind as being the subtle part of prakṛti. It is made up of three faculties: the sense mind (manas), the intellect (buddhi), and the ego (ahaṁkāra). These faculties perform various functions but are by themselves unable to produce consciousness, which belongs to a distinct ontological category and for which puruṣa alone is responsible. The Yoga school agrees with Samkhya philosophy on the fundamental dualism between puruṣa and prakṛti but it differs from Samkhya's atheistic position by incorporating the concept of a "personal, yet essentially inactive, deity" or "personal god" (Ishvara). These two schools stand in contrast to Advaita Vedanta, which adheres to non-duality by revealing that the apparent plurality of things is an illusion (Maya) hiding the true oneness of reality at its most fundamental level (Brahman).

Medieval 
Medieval ontology was strongly influenced by Aristotle's teachings. The thinkers of this period often relied on Aristotelian categories like substance, act and potency or matter and form to formulate their own theories. Important ontologists in this epoch include Avicenna, Thomas Aquinas, Duns Scotus and William of Ockham.

Avicenna 
According to Avicenna's interpretation of Greek Aristotelian and Platonist ontological doctrines in medieval metaphysics, being is either necessary, contingent qua possible, or impossible. Necessary being is that which cannot but be, since its non-being would entail a contradiction. Contingent qua possible being is neither necessary nor impossible for it to be or not to be. It is ontologically neutral, and is brought from potential existing into actual existence by way of a cause that is external to its essence. Its being is borrowed – unlike the necessary existent, which is self-subsisting and impossible not to be. As for the impossible, it necessarily does not exist, and the affirmation of its being would involve a contradiction.

Aquinas 
Fundamental to Thomas Aquinas's ontology is his distinction between essence and existence: all entities are conceived as composites of essence and existence. The essence of a thing is what this thing is like, it signifies the definition of this thing. God has a special status since He is the only entity whose essence is identical to its existence. But for all other, finite entities there is a real distinction between essence and existence. This distinction shows itself, for example, in our ability to understand the essence of something without knowing about its existence. Aquinas conceives of existence as an act of being that actualizes the potency given by the essence. Different things have different essences, which impose different limits on the corresponding act of being. The paradigm examples of essence-existence-composites are material substances like cats or trees. Aquinas incorporates Aristotle's distinction between matter and form by holding that the essence of material things, as opposed to the essence of immaterial things like angels, is the composition of their matter and form. So, for example, the essence of a marble statue would be the composition of the marble (its matter) and the shape it has (its form). Form is universal since substances made of different matter can have the same form. The forms of a substance may be divided into substantial and accidental forms. A substance can survive a change of an accidental form but ceases to exist upon a change of a substantial form.

Modern 
Ontology is increasingly seen as a separate domain of philosophy in the modern period. Many ontological theories of this period were rationalistic in the sense that they saw ontology largely as a deductive discipline that starts from a small set of first principles or axioms, a position best exemplified by Baruch Spinoza and Christian Wolff. This rationalism in metaphysics and ontology was strongly opposed by Immanuel Kant, who insisted that many claims arrived at this way are to be dismissed since they go beyond any possible experience that could justify them.

Descartes 
René Descartes' ontological distinction between mind and body has been one of the most influential parts of his philosophy. On his view, minds are thinking things while bodies are extended things. Thought and extension are two attributes that each come in various modes of being. Modes of thinking include judgments, doubts, volitions, sensations and emotions while the shapes of material things are modes of extension. Modes come with a lower degree of reality since they depend for their existence on a substance. Substances, on the other hand, can exist on their own. Descartes' substance dualism asserts that every finite substance is either a thinking substance or an extended substance. This position does not entail that minds and bodies actually are separated from each other, which would defy the intuition that we both have a body and a mind. Instead, it implies that minds and bodies can, at least in principle, be separated, since they are distinct substances and therefore are capable of independent existence. A longstanding problem for substance dualism since its inception has been to explain how minds and bodies can causally interact with each other, as they apparently do, when a volition causes an arm to move or when light falling on the retina causes a visual impression.

Spinoza 
Baruch Spinoza is well-known for his substance monism: the thesis that only one substance exists. He refers to this substance as "God or Nature", emphasizing both his pantheism and his naturalism. This substance has an infinite amount of attributes, which he defines as "what the intellect perceives of substance as constituting its essence". Of these attributes, only two are accessible to the human mind: thought and extension. Modes are properties of a substance that follow from its attributes and therefore have only a dependent form of existence. Spinoza sees everyday-things like rocks, cats or ourselves as mere modes and thereby opposes the traditional Aristotelian and Cartesian conception of categorizing them as substances. Modes compose deterministic systems in which the different modes are linked to each other as cause and effect. Each deterministic system corresponds to one attribute: one for extended things, one for thinking things, etc. Causal relations only happen within a system while the different systems run in parallel without causally interacting with each other. Spinoza calls the system of modes Natura naturata ("nature natured") and opposes it to Natura naturans ("nature naturing"), the attributes responsible for the modes. Everything in Spinoza's system is necessary: there are no contingent entities. This is so since the attributes are themselves necessary and since the system of modes follows from them.

Wolff 
Christian Wolff defines ontology as the science of being in general. He sees it as a part of metaphysics besides cosmology, psychology and natural theology. According to Wolff, it is a deductive science, knowable a priori and based on two fundamental principles: the principle of non-contradiction ("it cannot happen that the same thing is and is not") and the principle of sufficient reason ("nothing exists without a sufficient reason for why it exists rather than does not exist"). Beings are defined by their determinations or predicates, which cannot involve a contradiction. Determinates come in 3 types: essentialia, attributes, and modes. Essentialia define the nature of a being and are therefore necessary properties of this being. Attributes are determinations that follow from essentialia and are equally necessary, in contrast to modes, which are merely contingent. Wolff conceives existence as just one determination among others, which a being may lack. Ontology is interested in being at large, not just in actual being. But all beings, whether actually existing or not, have a sufficient reason. The sufficient reason for things without actual existence consists in all the determinations that make up the essential nature of this thing. Wolff refers to this as a "reason of being" and contrasts it with a "reason of becoming", which explains why some things have actual existence.

Schopenhauer 
Arthur Schopenhauer was a proponent of metaphysical voluntarism: he regards will as the underlying and ultimate reality. Reality as a whole consists only of one will, which is equated with the Kantian thing-in-itself. Like the Kantian thing-in-itself, the will exists outside space and time. But, unlike the Kantian thing-in-itself, the will has an experiential component to it: it comes in the form of striving, desiring, feeling, etc. The manifold of things we encounter in our everyday experiences, like trees or cars, are mere appearances that lack existence independent of the observer. Schopenhauer describes them as objectivations of the will. These objectivations happen in different "steps", which correspond to the platonic forms. All objectivations are grounded in the will. This grounding is governed by the principium individuationis, which enables a manifold of individual things spread out in space and time to be grounded in the one will.

20th century 
Dominant approaches to ontology in the 20th century were phenomenology, linguistic analysis and naturalism. Phenomenological ontology, as exemplified by Edmund Husserl and Martin Heidegger, relies for its method on the description of experience. Linguistic analysis assigns to language a central role for ontology, as seen, for example, in Rudolf Carnap's thesis that the truth value of existence-claims depends on the linguistic framework in which they are made. Naturalism gives a prominent position to the natural sciences for the purpose of finding and evaluating ontological claims. This position is exemplified by Quine's method of ontology, which involves analyzing the ontological commitments of scientific theories.

Husserl 
Edmund Husserl sees ontology as a science of essences. Sciences of essences are contrasted with factual sciences: the former are knowable a priori and provide the foundation for the later, which are knowable a posteriori. Ontology as a science of essences is not interested in actual facts, but in the essences themselves, whether they have instances or not. Husserl distinguishes between formal ontology, which investigates the essence of objectivity in general, and regional ontologies, which study regional essences that are shared by all entities belonging to the region. Regions correspond to the highest genera of concrete entities: material nature, personal consciousness and interpersonal spirit. Husserl's method for studying ontology and sciences of essence in general is called eidetic variation. It involves imagining an object of the kind under investigation and varying its features. The changed feature is inessential to this kind if the object can survive its change, otherwise it belongs to the kind's essence. For example, a triangle remains a triangle if one of its sides is extended but it ceases to be a triangle if a fourth side is added. Regional ontology involves applying this method to the essences corresponding to the highest genera.

Heidegger 
Central to Martin Heidegger's philosophy is the notion of ontological difference: the difference between being as such and specific entities. He accuses the philosophical tradition of being forgetful of this distinction, which has led to the mistake of understanding being as such as a kind of ultimate entity, for example as "idea, energeia, substance, monad or will to power". Heidegger tries to rectify this mistake in his own "fundamental ontology" by focusing on the meaning of being instead, a project which is akin to contemporary meta-ontology. One method to achieve this is by studying the human being, or Dasein, in Heidegger's terminology. The reason for this is that we already have a pre-ontological understanding of being that shapes how we experience the world. Phenomenology can be used to make this implicit understanding explicit, but it has to be accompanied by hermeneutics in order to avoid the distortions due to the forgetfulness of being. In his later philosophy, Heidegger attempted to reconstruct the "history of being" in order to show how the different epochs in the history of philosophy were dominated by different conceptions of being. His goal is to retrieve the original experience of being present in the early Greek thought that was covered up by later philosophers.

Hartmann 
Nicolai Hartmann is a 20th-century philosopher within the continental tradition of philosophy. He interprets ontology as Aristotle's science of being qua being: the science of the most general characteristics of entities, usually referred to as categories, and the relations between them. According to Hartmann, the most general categories are moments of being (existence and essence), modes of being (reality and ideality) and modalities of being (possibility, actuality and necessity). Every entity has both existence and essence. Reality and ideality, by contrast, are two disjunctive categories: every entity is either real or ideal. Ideal entities are universal, returnable and always existing while real entities are individual, unique and destructible. Among the ideal entities are mathematical objects and values. The modalities of being are divided into the absolute modalities (actuality and non-actuality) and the relative modalities (possibility, impossibility and necessity). The relative modalities are relative in the sense that they depend on the absolute modalities: something is possible, impossible or necessary because something else is actual. Hartmann asserts that reality is made up of four levels (inanimate, biological, psychological and spiritual) that form a hierarchy.

Carnap 
Rudolf Carnap proposed that the truth value of ontological statements about the existence of entities depends on the linguistic framework in which these statements are made: they are internal to the framework. As such, they are often trivial in that it just depends on the rules and definitions within this framework. For example, it follows analytically from the rules and definitions within the mathematical framework that numbers exist. The problem Carnap saw with traditional ontologists is that they try to make framework-independent or external statements about what really is the case. Such statements are at best pragmatic considerations about which framework to choose and at worst outright meaningless, according to Carnap. For example, there is no matter of fact as to whether realism or idealism is true, their truth depends on the adopted framework. The job of philosophers is not to discover which things exist by themselves but "conceptual engineering": to create interesting frameworks and to explore the consequences of adopting them. The choice of framework is guided by practical considerations like expedience or fruitfulness since there is no framework-independent notion of truth.

Quine 
The notion of ontological commitment plays a central role in Willard Van Orman Quine's contributions to ontology. A theory is ontologically committed to an entity if that entity must exist in order for the theory to be true. Quine proposed that the best way to determine this is by translating the theory in question into first-order predicate logic. Of special interest in this translation are the logical constants known as existential quantifiers, whose meaning corresponds to expressions like "there exists..." or "for some...". They are used to bind the variables in the expression following the quantifier. The ontological commitments of the theory then correspond to the variables bound by existential quantifiers. This approach is summed up by Quine's famous dictum that "[t]o be is to be the value of a variable". This method by itself is not sufficient for ontology since it depends on a theory in order to result in ontological commitments. Quine proposed that we should base our ontology on our best scientific theory. Various followers of Quine's method chose to apply it to different fields, for example to "everyday conceptions expressed in natural language".

Other ontological topics

Ontological formations 
The concept of ontological formations refers to formations of social relations understood as dominant ways of living. Temporal, spatial, corporeal, epistemological, and performative relations are taken to be central to understanding a dominant formation. That is, a particular ontological formation is based on how ontological categories of time, space, embodiment, knowing and performing are lived—objectively and subjectively. Different ontological formations include the customary (including the tribal), the traditional, the modern, and the postmodern. The concept was first introduced by Paul James in 2006, together with a series of writers including Damian Grenfell and Manfred Steger.

In the engaged theory approach, ontological formations are seen as layered and intersecting rather than singular formations. They are 'formations of being'. This approach avoids the usual problems of a Great Divide being posited between the modern and the pre-modern. From a philosophical distinction concerning different formations of being, the concept then provides a way of translating into practical understandings concerning how humans might design cities and communities that live creatively across different ontological formations, for example cities that are not completely dominated by modern valences of spatial configuration. Here the work of Tony Fry is important.

Ontology of fictional characters 

According to Edward N. Zalta, the ontology of fiction analyses such sentences as:
 'Nero worshipped (the god) Mars;'
 'Mars, the god, does not exist;' and
 'Eliza Doolittle, in George Bernard Shaw's Pygmalion, is a flower girl.'

According to Amie L. Thomasson, fictional discourse can be of four sorts:

 Uttered within works of fiction;
 Philosophical exercises such as 'Captain Marvel does not exist';
 Treating fictional characters as if they were 'real', such as 'Superman can leap tall buildings;' and
 Discourse about works of fiction, such as 'Professor Higgins was created by George Bernard Shaw'.

Jeremy Bentham distinguished three kinds of entities:

 the real: those that can be perceived, or can be inferred from perception.
 the fictitious: abstractions that referred to perceptible things.
 the fabulous: those that can be found only in the imagination, where the word 'exist' applies to such only in the sense that they do not really exist.

Francis Herbert Bradley thought that real things exist respectively at particular times and places. He recognised several kinds of entity:
the genuinely historical;
 the fictional;
 the real;
 the merely imagined;
 the existent; and
 the non-existent.

Alexius Meinong would put fictional entities into the category which he called subsistence. This category contains objects that neither exist spatially or non-spatially. However, they do have properties. The properties are given to these objects in the way they are said to be described. For example, we can talk about the tall unicorn even though the tall unicorn does not exist. We can say the unicorn is in fact tall because this follows from the properties in which the object is characterized.

Ontological and epistemological certainty 
René Descartes, with cogito, ergo sum (je pense donc je suis, "I think, therefore I am"), argued that a person's thinking agency, his res cogitans, as distinct from his material body, his res extensa, is something that we can know exists with epistemological certainty. Descartes argued further that this knowledge could lead to a proof of the certainty of the existence of God, using the ontological argument that had been formulated first by Anselm of Canterbury.

Body and environment, questioning the meaning of being 
Schools of subjectivism, objectivism and relativism existed at various times in the 20th century, and the postmodernists and body philosophers tried to reframe all these questions in terms of bodies taking some specific action in an environment. This relied to a great degree on insights derived from scientific research into animals taking instinctive action in natural and artificial settings—as studied by biology, ecology, and cognitive science.

The processes by which bodies related to environments became of great concern, and the idea of being itself became difficult to really define. What did people mean when they said "A is B", "A must be B", "A was B"...? Some linguists advocated dropping the verb "to be" from the English language, leaving "E Prime", supposedly less prone to bad abstractions. Others, mostly philosophers, tried to dig into the word and its usage. Martin Heidegger distinguished human being as existence from the being of things in the world. Heidegger proposes that our way of being human and the way the world is for us are cast historically through a fundamental ontological questioning. These fundamental ontological categories provide the basis for communication in an age: a horizon of unspoken and seemingly unquestionable background meanings, such as human beings understood unquestioningly as subjects and other entities understood unquestioningly as objects. Because these basic ontological meanings both generate and are regenerated in everyday interactions, the locus of our way of being in a historical epoch is the communicative event of language in use. For Heidegger, however, communication in the first place is not among human beings, but language itself shapes up in response to questioning (the inexhaustible meaning of) being. Even the focus of traditional ontology on the 'whatness' or quidditas of beings in their substantial, standing presence can be shifted to pose the question of the 'whoness' of human being itself.

Ontology and language 
Some philosophers suggest that the question of "What is?" is (at least in part) an issue of usage rather than a question about facts. This perspective is conveyed by an analogy made by Donald Davidson: Suppose a person refers to a 'cup' as a 'chair' and makes some comments pertinent to a cup, but uses the word 'chair' consistently throughout instead of 'cup'. One might readily catch on that this person simply calls a 'cup' a 'chair' and the oddity is explained. Analogously, if we find people asserting 'there are' such-and-such, and we do not ourselves think that 'such-and-such' exist, we might conclude that these people are not nuts (Davidson calls this assumption 'charity'), they simply use 'there are' differently than we do. The question of What is? is at least partly a topic in the philosophy of language, and is not entirely about ontology itself. This viewpoint has been expressed by Eli Hirsch.

Hirsch interprets Hilary Putnam as asserting that different concepts of "the existence of something" can be correct. This position does not contradict the view that some things do exist, but points out that different 'languages' will have different rules about assigning this property. How to determine the 'fitness' of a 'language' to the world then becomes a subject for investigation.

Common to all Indo-European copula languages is the double use of the verb "to be" in both stating that entity X exists ("X is.") as well as stating that X has a property ("X is P"). It is sometimes argued that a third use is also distinct, stating that X is a member of a class ("X is a C"). In other language families these roles may have completely different verbs and are less likely to be confused with one another. For example they might say something like "the car has redness" rather than "the car is red." Hence any discussion of "being" in Indo-European language philosophy may need to make distinctions between these senses.

Ontology and human geography 
In human geography there are two types of ontology: small "o" which accounts for the practical orientation, describing functions of being a part of the group, thought to oversimplify and ignore key activities. The other "o", or big "O", systematically, logically, and rationally describes the essential characteristics and universal traits. This concept relates closely to Plato's view that the human mind can only perceive a bigger world if they continue to live within the confines of their "caves". However, in spite of the differences, ontology relies on the symbolic agreements among members. That said, ontology is crucial for the axiomatic language frameworks.

Anthropology 
The topic of ontology has received increased attention in anthropology since the 1990s. This is sometimes termed the "ontological turn". This type of inquiry is focused on how people from different cultures experience and understand the nature of being. Specific interest in this regard has been given to the ontological outlook of indigenous people and how their outlook tends to differ from a more Western perspective. As an example of this contrast, it has been argued that various indigenous communities ascribe intentionality to non-human entities, like plants, forests, or rivers. This outlook is known as animism.

Reality and actuality 
According to Alfred N. Whitehead, for ontology, it is useful to distinguish the terms 'reality' and 'actuality'. In this view, an 'actual entity' has a philosophical status of fundamental ontological priority, while a 'real entity' is one which may be actual, or may derive its reality from its logical relation to some actual entity or entities. For example, an occasion in the life of Socrates is an actual entity. But Socrates' being a man does not make 'man' an actual entity, because it refers indeterminately to many actual entities, such as several occasions in the life of Socrates, and also to several occasions in the lives of Alcibiades, and of others. But the notion of man is real; it derives its reality from its reference to those many actual occasions, each of which is an actual entity. An actual occasion is a concrete entity, while terms such as 'man' are abstractions from many concrete relevant entities.

According to Whitehead, an actual entity must earn its philosophical status of fundamental ontological priority by satisfying several philosophical criteria, as follows:
 There is no going behind an actual entity, to find something more fundamental in fact or in efficacy. This criterion is to be regarded as expressing an axiom, or postulated distinguished doctrine.
 An actual entity must be completely determinate in the sense that there may be no confusion about its identity that would allow it to be confounded with another actual entity. In this sense an actual entity is completely concrete, with no potential to be something other than itself. It is what it is. It is a source of potentiality for the creation of other actual entities, of which it may be said to be a part cause. Likewise it is the concretion or realization of potentialities of other actual entities which are its partial causes.
 Causation between actual entities is essential to their actuality. Consequently, for Whitehead, each actual entity has its distinct and definite extension in physical Minkowski space, and so is uniquely identifiable. A description in Minkowski space supports descriptions in time and space for particular observers.
 It is part of the aim of the philosophy of such an ontology as Whitehead's that the actual entities should be all alike, qua actual entities; they should all satisfy a single definite set of well stated ontological criteria of actuality.

Whitehead proposed that his notion of an occasion of experience satisfies the criteria for its status as the philosophically preferred definition of an actual entity. From a purely logical point of view, each occasion of experience has in full measure the characters of both objective and subjective reality. Subjectivity and objectivity refer to different aspects of an occasion of experience, and in no way do they exclude each other.

Examples of other philosophical proposals or candidates as actual entities, in this view, are Aristotle's 'substances', Leibniz' monads, and Descartes' res verae, and the more modern 'states of affairs'. Aristotle's substances, such as Socrates, have behind them as more fundamental the 'primary substances', and in this sense do not satisfy Whitehead's criteria. Whitehead is not happy with Leibniz' monads as actual entities because they are "windowless" and do not cause each other. 'States of affairs' are often not closely defined, often without specific mention of extension in physical Minkowski space; they are therefore not necessarily processes of becoming, but may be as their name suggests, simply static states in some sense. States of affairs are contingent on particulars, and therefore have something behind them. One summary of the Whiteheadian actual entity is that it is a process of becoming. Another summary, referring to its causal linkage to other actual entities, is that it is "all window", in contrast with Leibniz' windowless monads.

This view allows philosophical entities other than actual entities to really exist, but not as fundamentally and primarily factual or causally efficacious; they have existence as abstractions, with reality only derived from their reference to actual entities. A Whiteheadian actual entity has a unique and completely definite place and time. Whiteheadian abstractions are not so tightly defined in time and place, and in the extreme, some are timeless and placeless, or 'eternal' entities. All abstractions have logical or conceptual rather than efficacious existence; their lack of definite time does not make them unreal if they refer to actual entities. Whitehead calls this 'the ontological principle'.

Microcosmic ontology 
There is an established and long philosophical history of the concept of atoms as microscopic physical objects. They are far too small to be visible to the naked eye. It was as recent as the nineteenth century that precise estimates of the sizes of putative physical atoms began to become plausible. Almost direct empirical observation of atomic effects was due to the theoretical investigation of Brownian motion by Albert Einstein in the very early twentieth century. But even then, the real existence of atoms was debated by some. Such debate might be labeled 'microcosmic ontology'. Here the word 'microcosm' is used to indicate a physical world of small entities, such as for example atoms.

Subatomic particles are usually considered to be much smaller than atoms. Their real or actual existence may be very difficult to demonstrate empirically. A distinction is sometimes drawn between actual and virtual subatomic particles. Reasonably, one may ask, in what sense, if any, do virtual particles exist as physical entities? For atomic and subatomic particles, difficult questions arise, such as do they possess a precise position, or a precise momentum? A question that continues to be controversial is "to what kind of physical thing, if any, does the quantum mechanical wave function refer?"

Ontological argument 

In the Western Christian tradition, in his 1078 work Proslogion, Anselm of Canterbury proposed what is known as 'the ontological argument' for the existence of God. Anselm defined God as "that than which nothing greater can be thought", and argued that this being must exist in the mind, even in the mind of the person who denies the existence of God. He suggested that, if the greatest possible being exists in the mind, it must also exist in reality. If it only exists in the mind, then an even greater being must be possible—one which exists both in the mind and in reality. Therefore, this greatest possible being must exist in reality. Seventeenth century French philosopher René Descartes deployed a similar argument. Descartes published several variations of his argument, each of which centred on the idea that God's existence is immediately inferable from a "clear and distinct" idea of a supremely perfect being. In the early eighteenth century, Gottfried Leibniz augmented Descartes's ideas in an attempt to prove that a "supremely perfect" being is a coherent concept. Norman Malcolm revived the ontological argument in 1960 when he located a second, stronger ontological argument in Anselm's work; Alvin Plantinga challenged this argument and proposed an alternative, based on modal logic. Attempts have also been made to validate Anselm's proof using an automated theorem prover.

More recently, Kurt Gödel proposed a formal argument for God's existence. Other arguments for God's existence have been advanced, including those made by Islamic philosophers Mulla Sadra and Allama Tabatabai.

Hintikka's locution for existence

Jaakko Hintikka puts the view that a useful explication of the notion of existence is in the words "one can find," implicitly in some world or universe of discourse.

See also

Notes

References

External links 

 
 

 
Meaning (philosophy of language)